Centrum is a residential area in Umeå, Sweden.

External links
Centrum at Umeå Municipality

Umeå